Mikhail Batura (born 16 May 1950) is a Belarusian scientist and university rector accused of political repressions.

He is a Doctor of Technical Sciences; Professor; Rector of the Belarusian State University of Informatics and Radioelectronics; member of the International Higher Education Academy of Sciences. His areas of scientific interest include system analysis, information processing and control in technical and organizational systems. Mikhail Batura has authored more than 150 scientific works and publications.

As part of the international sanctions against the regime in Belarus following a crackdown of the opposition following the 2010 Belarusian presidential election, Mikhail Batura became subject to travel ban and asset freeze by the European Union as part of a list of Belarusian officials responsible for political repressions, vote rigging and propaganda.

In its decision, the EU Council accused Batura of being responsible "for the expulsion of students involved in protests following the December 2010 elections."

References

External links
 Administration of the Belarusian State University of Informatics and Radioelectronics

1950 births
Living people
Belarusian State University of Informatics and Radioelectronics alumni